While(1<2) (stylized in all lowercase; pronounced "while one is less than two") is the seventh studio album by Canadian electronic music producer Deadmau5, released on June 17, 2014 by Mau5trap, Virgin EMI and Astralwerks, his only album to be released by the latter.

The album is a notable departure from the bass-heavy, upbeat template of his previous work, instead foraying in a more experimental direction, with tones of downtempo and ambient music. Many of the songs on the album were originally uploaded to Deadmau5's SoundCloud account before they were removed from the site in early 2014.

The album received a positive reception from critics, who applauded its experimental nature, although some viewed this as its weak point. It peaked at number 9 on the Billboard 200, becoming his second top-ten album.

Background
On January 7, 2014, Deadmau5 announced on Twitter that his seventh album was completed. He also announced that it was a double album containing a continuous mix for each disc and that the album as a whole, minus the mixes, would contain 25 tracks. On May 10, 2014, While(1<2) was officially unveiled by Deadmau5 through his subscription service, and also announced the album's digital release date of June 17, 2014 with a physical release on June 24.

Singles
The first single "Avaritia" became available for purchase on May 20, 2014. One week later, the second single "Seeya", featuring singer Colleen D'Agostino from the band The Material, was made available for purchase on iTunes. On 2 June 2014, the third single "Infra Turbo Pigcart Racer" premiered on mau5trap's SoundCloud page. It was made available for download on iTunes and Beatport the next day. The album's fourth and final single, "Phantoms Can't Hang", was also premiered through SoundCloud the day before its release on iTunes and Beatport which was on 10 June 2014.

Critical reception

While(1<2) received favorable reviews from critics. It currently holds a score of 66 on Metacritic, indicating "generally favourable reviews". Billboard gave the album 4.5/5 stars stating "Sprawling, ambitious and mostly well-executed, "While(1<2) may confuse his fan base's Ultra-attending electro house contingent, but Deadmau5's double album undoubtedly marks his most mature and forward-thinking release to date". AllMusic also reviewed positively expressing "While(1<2) is a very good, very restrained, and very inspired Deadmau5 effort. It is a welcome space-walk surprise, recommended for all aspiring EDM astronauts and Ghost in the Shell cast members", with a score of 3.5/5 stars.

Rolling Stone was more critical of the album, stating "Deadmau5 has turned from an electro-house polymath into the world's most unnecessary Nine Inch Nails tribute act", giving it 2 stars out of 5. Slant Magazine was equally critical saying "Deadmau5 enters the fray with the advantage of deeply diminished expectations. His latest, While(1<2), comfortably clears the bar set by his contemporaries, and that would be impressive if the bar wasn't buried underground", also awarding it 2 stars.

Track listing

Note
Some physical copies of the album, including the vinyl version, feature the full version of "Infra Turbo Pigcart Racer", which is 10:36. The promotional single for the song also features this full version.

Charts

Weekly charts

Year-end charts

Release history

References

2014 albums
Astralwerks albums
Deadmau5 albums
Mau5trap albums
Virgin EMI Records albums